Trout Bog Lake, also known as Bog 12-15, is a small bog lake in Vilas County, Wisconsin. It is located near the south basin of the much larger Trout Lake. The lake is entirely surrounded by vegetation, except for a logging road that provides access to it. Being a bog, the pH is extremely low; on average it is 4.8.

Limnology and Trout Bog

Trout Bog Lake is one of seven lakes studied at the North Temperate Lakes Long Term Ecological Research Network (LTER) site. The lake also houses a sensor buoy, which feeds data to the Global Lake Ecological Observatory Network (GLEON).

Fish species
Very few fish species call Trout Bog home. The most common species by far in the lake is the central mudminnow. Bluegill and black bullhead have also been recorded.

Notes

Lakes of Wisconsin
Lakes of Vilas County, Wisconsin